Celso Aguirre Bernal was a Mexican writer and historian. He was born in Puerto de Canoas, Sinaloa in 1916 and died in 1997 in Mexicali, where he had lived since the 1950s.

He published Compendio histórico-biográfico de Mexicali (1968), Suplemento histórico-biográfico de Mexicali (1970), Tijuana. Su historia-sus hombres (1975), 30 años de gobierno municipal 1953-1983 (1982), Joaquín Murrieta, raíz y razón del movimiento chicano (1985), Breve historia del estado de Baja California (1987), among several articles and chronicles.

References

20th-century Mexican historians
1916 births
1997 deaths
Writers from Sinaloa